Davidov Spur (‘Davidov Rid’ \da-'vi-dov 'rid\ is the narrow rocky ridge of elevation 1492 m projecting from Detroit Plateau 2.75 km west-northwestwards into upper Cayley Glacier on Danco Coast in Graham Land, Antarctica.

The ridge is named after Niki Davidov, photographer at St. Kliment Ohridski base in 2000/01 and 2009/10 seasons, for his work on promoting awareness and appreciation of Antarctica.

Location
British mapping in 1978.

Maps
British Antarctic Territory. Scale 1:200000 topographic map. DOS 610 Series, Sheet W 64 60. Directorate of Overseas Surveys, Tolworth, UK, 1978.
 Antarctic Digital Database (ADD). Scale 1:250000 topographic map of Antarctica. Scientific Committee on Antarctic Research (SCAR). Since 1993, regularly upgraded and updated.

Notes

References
 Bulgarian Antarctic Gazetteer. Antarctic Place-names Commission. (details in Bulgarian, basic data in English)
Davidov Spur. SCAR Composite Gazetteer of Antarctica.

External links
 Davidov Spur. Adjusted Copernix satellite image

Ridges of Graham Land
Bulgaria and the Antarctic
Danco Coast